Anthony Alan Alexander (8 February 1935 – 9 October 2013) was an English footballer who played in the Football League for Reading as an inside-forward.

Alexander also played for Yeovil Town, Crystal Palace and Bedford Town.

References

External links
 

1935 births
2013 deaths
English footballers
English Football League players
Association football inside forwards
Reading F.C. players
Yeovil Town F.C. players
Crystal Palace F.C. players